
Bretelli is a restaurant in Weert in the Netherlands. It is a quality restaurant that is awarded one Michelin star in 2007 and retained that rating until present. In the period 2002-2006 the restaurant held a Bib Gourmand.

In 2013, GaultMillau awarded the restaurant 16 out of 20 points.

From the beginning, Jan Marrees has been the head chef of Bretelli. Since 2010, he is also the owner of the restaurant.

Although the name of the restaurant suggest an Italian connection, the restaurant is named after a set of braces or suspenders (bretels in Dutch).

See also
List of Michelin starred restaurants in the Netherlands

References 

Restaurants in the Netherlands
Michelin Guide starred restaurants in the Netherlands
Restaurants in Limburg (Netherlands)
Buildings and structures in Weert